Abul Fadl Mohsin Ebrahim is a Seychellois scholar of Islamic bioethics and emeritus professor of Islamic Studies in the School of Religion and Theology at the University of KwaZulu-Natal in  South Africa. He is a Senior Professor and researcher at the Regent Business School in  Durban, South Africa and the Academic Research Director of the International Institute of Islamic Thought.

Biography
Ebrahim, a Seychelles native, finished his initial studies on Islam at the Aleemiyah Institute of Islamic Studies in Karachi, Pakistan, in 1975, and then went on to receive a Bachelor of Theology (B.Th.) degree at Cairo's Al-Azhar University in 1977. He then went on to Temple University in Philadelphia, where he earned his M.A. and Ph.D. degrees in 1983 and 1986 respectively. He is currently serving as Professor Emeritus in the School of Religion, Philosophy and Classics at the University of KwaZulu-Natal; and a Senior Professor and Researcher at the REGENT Business School, in Durban, South Africa.

Works

 Abortion, Birth Control and Surrogate Parenting: An Islamic Perspective (1989)
 Islamic Guidelines on Animals Experimentation (1992)
 Biomedical Issues: Islamic Perspective (1993)
 Ethics of Medical Research: Some Islamic Considerations (1994)
 Organ Transplantation: Contemporary Islamic Legal and Ethical Perspectives (1998)
 Organ transplantation, euthanasia, cloning and animal experimentation (2001)
 Reproductive Health and Islamic Values: Ethical and Legal Insights (2001)
 Muslims in Seychelles: A Historical Appraisal of Their Legacy (2016)

References

External links
 Official web page at the University of KwaZulu-Natal

Year of birth missing (living people)
Living people
Islamic studies scholars
Seychellois people
Academic staff of the University of KwaZulu-Natal
Muslim scholars of Islamic studies